Semyon Dezhnev is a 1983 Soviet adventure film directed by Nikolai Gusarov.

Plot 
The film tells about the Russian traveler Semyon Dezhnev, who discovered new Siberian lands, sailed from the Stone Belt to the east of the Eurasian continent and discovered the strait between Asia and North America.

Cast 
 Aleksey Buldakov as Semyon Dezhnev
 Leonid Nevedomsky as Mikhailo Stadukhin
 Viktor Grigoryuk as Gerasim Ankudinov
 Margarita Borisova as Abakayada
 Ivan Krasko as Kupets Guselnikov
 Olga Sirina
 Oleg Korchikov as Fyodor Popov
 Nikolai Gusarov as Timoshka
 Stepan Yemelyanov
 Gennadiy Yukhtin as Kotkin

References

External links 
 

1983 films
1980s Russian-language films
Soviet adventure films
1980s adventure films